Joel Ashton McCarthy is a Canadian film director.

Career
McCarthy's debut feature, the documentary Taking My Parents to Burning Man (2014), successfully crowdfunded $10,000 and won multiple awards. In 2016, McCarthy won a Leo Award for directing the Crazy8s short film I Love You So Much It's Killing Them. In 2017, he was nominated for a Gotham Award for his series, Inconceivable, which won $50,000 from Telus Storyhive.

McCarthy later founded and ran the Vancouver 48-hour Run N Gun film competition.

Selected filmography

As director 

Taking My Parents to Burning Man (2014)
I Love You So Much It's Killing Them (2016, for Crazy8s)
Inconceivable (2016-2017)
I Am Alfred Hitchcock (2021)

References

External links

Film directors from Vancouver
Living people
Year of birth missing (living people)